The Park Tower is an historic structure located in the Adams Morgan neighborhood of Washington, D.C.  It has been listed on the District of Columbia Inventory of Historic Sites since 1988 and it was listed on the National Register of Historic Places in 1989.

History
William Harris designed the structure, which was completed in 1929.  It was one of the first buildings in the city to break away from the Beaux-Arts and Colonial Revival styles that predominated in Washington architecture up to that time.  The building was home to congressmen, professionals and other notable people in the 1930s and illustrates the desire to maintain Sixteenth Street as fashionable street on which to reside.

Architecture
The five-story structure features an irregular plan with a ziggurat-like main façade.  The rooftop loggia rises above squared bays.  The exterior is a series of repetitive bays  covered in golden buff-colored brick.  The building also features limestone and patterned brick with chevron, diaper and oak leaf motifs.

References

Residential buildings completed in 1929
Apartment buildings in Washington, D.C.
Art Deco architecture in Washington, D.C.
Residential buildings on the National Register of Historic Places in Washington, D.C.
Adams Morgan